Gelastorhinus is a genus of grasshoppers in the subfamily Gomphocerinae (no tribe assigned).  Species have been recorded from tropical Africa and Asia.

Species
The Orthoptera Species File lists:
 Gelastorhinus liaoningensis Lu, Wang & Ren, 2013
 Gelastorhinus africanus Uvarov, 1941
 Gelastorhinus albolineatus Brunner von Wattenwyl, 1893type species (locality: Bhamo, Myanmar)
 Gelastorhinus baghensis Mahmood & Yousuf, 1998
 Gelastorhinus chinensis Willemse, 1932
 Gelastorhinus dubia Willemse, 1932
 Gelastorhinus edax Saussure, 1899
 Gelastorhinus filatus (Walker, 1870)
 Gelastorhinus glacialis Fritze, 1900
 Gelastorhinus insulans Bey-Bienko, 1966
 Gelastorhinus laticornis (Serville, 1838)
 Gelastorhinus liaoningensis Wang, 2007
 Gelastorhinus macilentus (Stål, 1877)
 Gelastorhinus pictus (Walker, 1870)
 Gelastorhinus rotundatus Shiraki, 1910
 Gelastorhinus selache Burr, 1902
 Gelastorhinus semipictus (Walker, 1870)
 Gelastorhinus sinensis (Walker, 1871)
 Gelastorhinus striatus Willemse, 1932
 Gelastorhinus taeniatus (Serville, 1838)
 Gelastorhinus tibialis (Serville, 1838)
 Gelastorhinus tonkinensis Willemse, 1951
 Gelastorhinus tryxaloides Bolívar, 1902

References

External links
 Acrida.info: image of Gelastorhinus africanus
 

Gomphocerinae
Acrididae genera
Orthoptera of Africa
Orthoptera of Asia